2009 World Masters Athletics Championships is the eighteenth in a series of World Masters Athletics Outdoor Championships
that took place in Lahti, Finland from 28 July to 8 August 2009.

The main venue was Lahden Stadion located within Lah­den Ur­hei­lukeskus.

Supplemental venues included Radiomäen urheilukenttä in Radiomäki, Nastola Sport Field, Kisapuisto Field for throwing events,

and Fellmaninpuisto for start and finish of the Marathon.

This Championships was organized by World Masters Athletics (WMA) in coordination with a Local Organising Committee (LOC): Virpi Hurri, Hannu Nurminen, Pekka Mäki-Reinikka.

The WMA is the global governing body of the sport of athletics for athletes 35 years of age or older, setting rules for masters athletics competition.

In addition to a full range of track and field events,

non-stadia events included 8K Cross Country, 10K Race Walk (women), 20K Race Walk (men), and Marathon.

Results
Past Championships results are archived at WMA;

the 2009 results are available as a searchable pdf.

Additional archives are available from British Masters Athletic Federation

as a searchable pdf,

from European Masters Athletics

as a searchable pdf

and from Museum of Masters Track & Field

as a searchable pdf.

Masters world records set at this Championships are listed below.

Women

Men

References

External links

World Masters Athletics Championships
World Masters Athletics Championships
International athletics competitions hosted by Finland
2009
Masters athletics (track and field) records